The Professionals is the eponymous debut collaborative studio album by The Professionals, an American duo consisting of sibling producers/rappers Madlib and Oh No. Entirely produced by Madlib, with raps mainly being provided by Oh No, the album was released on January 17, 2020, on Madlib's own imprint Madlib Invazion. The album features guest appearances from Adub, Elzhi, Chino XL, Freddie Gibbs, The Alchemist, and members of the Crate Diggas Palace collective (Wildchild, Roc C, MED and Kazi).

Track listing
Credits adapted from Tidal and Qobuz.

References 

2019 albums
Madlib albums
Albums produced by Madlib
Oh No (musician) albums